Bereslavka is a rural locality (a settlement) and the administrative center of Bereslavskoye Rural Settlement, Kalachyovsky District, Volgograd Oblast, Russia. The population was 4,616 as of 2010. There are 39 streets.

Geography 
Bereslavka is located on south bank of the Bereslavskoye Reservoir, 46 km east of Kalach-na-Donu (the district's administrative centre) by road. Novy Rogachik is the nearest rural locality.

References 

Rural localities in Kalachyovsky District